Gadancourt is a former commune in the Val-d'Oise department in Île-de-France in northern France. On 1 January 2018, it was merged into the commune of Avernes.

See also
Communes of the Val-d'Oise department

References

External links

Former communes of Val-d'Oise
Populated places disestablished in 2018